The 1956 Minnesota Golden Gophers baseball team represented the University of Minnesota in the 1956 NCAA baseball season. The Golden Gophers played their home games at Delta Field. The team was coached by Dick Siebert in his 9th season at Minnesota.

The Golden Gophers won the College World Series, defeating the Arizona Wildcats in the championship game.

Roster

Schedule

Awards and honors 
Jerry Kindall
All-America First Team  
All-Big Ten First Team 
Jack McCartan
All-Big Ten First Team 
Jerry Thomas
All-American First Team 
All-Big Ten First Team
College World Series Most Outstanding Player

References

Minnesota
Minnesota Golden Gophers baseball seasons
College World Series seasons
NCAA Division I Baseball Championship seasons
Big Ten Conference baseball champion seasons
Golden Go